Alfred George Marshall (born 21 May 1933) is an English former footballer who played in the Football League as a full-back for Colchester United.

Career

Born in Dagenham, Marshall signed for Football League club Colchester United from his hometown club of Dagenham in 1958 for the sum of £25. He made his debut for Colchester on 8 October 1958 in a 0–0 draw with Reading at Elm Park. Marshall made 30 league appearances for the club between 1958 and 1961, making his final appearance on 29 April 1961 in a 4–3 win at home to Chesterfield.

On leaving Colchester, Marshall returned to non-league football with Clacton Town.

References

1933 births
Living people
Footballers from Dagenham
English footballers
Association football fullbacks
Dagenham F.C. players
Colchester United F.C. players
F.C. Clacton players
English Football League players